The Adjutant-class auxiliary motor minesweepers were built for the United States Navy throughout the  1950s and 1960s, even as late as 1978. Most were loaned to foreign countries under the Military Defense Assistance Pact, with only 24 actually commissioned by the US Navy, with 13 of those eventually being transferred to foreign nations as well. Initially classified as auxiliary motor minesweepers (AMS), on 7 February 1955, they were reclassified as coastal minesweepers (minesweeper, coastal) (MSC).

Design
The Adjutant-class minesweepers were of a wooden construction with brass and stainless steel fittings to reduce magnetic attraction.

Half of the US ships used four Packard  diesel engines. The rest and most of the ships built for use by foreign nations used two General Motors  8-268A diesel engines.

Classes
The first ship of the class was to be USS Adjutant (AMS-60). However, the name Adjutant was canceled and the ship was transferred to the Portuguese Navy as Ponta Delgada (M 405). This is where the US ships got their class name. With slight changes in design, some of the ships are referred to by other class names, such as Falcon class, Redwing class, Albatross class, or even under Adjutant class.

While in the service of foreign navies they could be referred to under other class names:

Ships in class

Citations

Bibliography

Online resources

Book resources

External links 

Mine warfare vessel classes
Ship classes of the Islamic Republic of Iran Navy